

Kurt Lottner (30 October 1899 – 15 March 1957) was a German general during World War II. He was a recipient of the Knight's Cross of the Iron Cross of Nazi Germany. 

Lottner was Kampfkommandant of Lübeck in April/May 1945. On 2 May, British troops prepared to conquer Lübeck. Lottner, NSDAP-Kreisleiter Bernhard Clausen, mayor Otto-Heinrich Drechsler, Police chief Walther Schröder and officers in place agreed that a fight against the advancing 11th Armoured Division was senseless. They gave orders to remove the explosive charges already put in place at bridges and harbour facilities.

Awards and decorations

 Knight's Cross of the Iron Cross on 14 October 1943 as Oberst and commander of Infanterie-Regiment 111

References

Citations

Bibliography

 
 Arthur Geoffrey Dickens: Lübeck Diary. Victor Gollancz Ltd., London 1947

1899 births
1957 deaths
Major generals of the German Army (Wehrmacht)
German Army personnel of World War I
Recipients of the clasp to the Iron Cross, 1st class
Recipients of the Gold German Cross
Recipients of the Knight's Cross of the Iron Cross
German prisoners of war in World War II held by the United Kingdom
People from the Province of Westphalia
Military personnel from Hamm
German Army generals of World War II